Heterocampa is a genus of prominent moths in the family Notodontidae. There are about 18 described species in Heterocampa, found in North, Central, and South America.

As a result of research published in 2021, some species of Heterocampa have been moved to the genera Cecrita, Macrurocampa, and Rifargia.

Species
These 18 species belong to the genus Heterocampa:
 Heterocampa albidiscata Schaus, 1904
 Heterocampa amanda Barnes & Lindsey, 1921
 Heterocampa andradora (Dyar 1910)
 Heterocampa astarte Doubleday, 1841 (astarte prominent moth)
 Heterocampa astartoides Benjamin, 1932
 Heterocampa averna Barnes & McDunnough, 1910
 Heterocampa bactrea Schaus, 1905
 Heterocampa baracoana Schaus, 1904
 Heterocampa daona Druce, 1904
 Heterocampa obliqua Packard, 1864 (oblique heterocampa)
 Heterocampa otiosa (Schaus, 1906)
 Heterocampa pulverea Grote & Robinson, 1867
 Heterocampa rufinans (Dyar, 1921)
 Heterocampa santiago Schaus, 1904
 Heterocampa secessionis Benjamin, 1932
 Heterocampa sylla Druce, 1887
 Heterocampa umbrata Walker, 1855 (white-blotched heterocampa)
 Heterocampa varia Walker, 1855 (sandplain heterocampa)

References

External links

 

Notodontidae